Faro is the surname of:

 Jonatas Faro (born 1987), Brazilian actor and singer
 Joseph Faro, pirate who primarily operated in the Indian Ocean
 Junior Faro (born 1978), weightlifter from Aruba
 Neusa Maria Faro (born 1945), Brazilian actress and dubber
 Rodrigo Faro (born 1973), Brazilian actor, singer and TV presenter